Net Deception (Traditional Chinese: 追魂交易) is a Hong Kong television crime drama serial released overseas in January 2004 and broadcast on Hong Kong's Jade network from 17 May to 9 June 2006.

Synopsis
The winner of the game almost loses his soul!
What can put him back on the path to self-discovery?

Tong Ka-Ming (Jack Wu) is a police cadet who got expelled for hacking into the school system to change his friend's grade. In order to join the police force again, Chong Chin-Pang (Eddie Kwan) made an offer to Ka-Ming, to be an undercover cop. His duty was to get close to Yiu Sing-Tin (Wong Hei) and find his criminal activities. Ka-Ming has no choice but to accept.

Chin Pang's superior had told him to close this case, but he refused because he has some personal differences with Sing-Tin. Yiu Sing-Tin is a successful game developer who opened an Internet cafe to hide his criminal identity which leads Ka-Ming a chance to join his team with his exceptional computer skills. Sing-Tin gives a lot of trust to Ka-Ming, however Ka-Ming makes one wrong move and Sing-Tin finds out his undercover identity...

Cast

External links 
TVB.com Net Deception - Official Website 

TVB dramas
2006 Hong Kong television series debuts
2006 Hong Kong television series endings